Staveley Works railway station was on the outskirts of the town of Staveley, Derbyshire.

The station was on the Great Central Chesterfield Loop which ran between Staveley Central and Heath Junction (just north of Heath railway station) on the Great Central Main Line.

References

Disused railway stations in Derbyshire
Former Great Central Railway stations
Railway stations in Great Britain opened in 1892
Railway stations in Great Britain closed in 1963